Abram Poindexter Maury (December 26, 1801 – July 22, 1848)  was an American politician, who represented Tennessee's eighth district in the United States House of Representatives. He was a slaveholder.

Biography
Maury was born near Franklin, Tennessee, on the plantation of his father, Abraham "Abram" Maury, Jr. After his preparatory studies, he became the editor of a newspaper in St. Louis, Missouri, at the age of sixteen. He next entered the United States Military Academy at West Point, New York, in 1820. He left the following year to pursue the study of law and edit a newspaper in Nashville, Tennessee.

In 1826, he married Mary Eliza Tennessee Claiborne (1806-1852), daughter of Sarah Terrell Lewis and Dr. Thomas Augustine Claiborne, whose family was politically well-connected in the South. They had nine children together, naming the seventh Septima and the eighth Octavia.

His father, Abraham Poindexter Maury, Jr. was a member of the Tennessee Senate and is the namesake of Maury County, Tennessee.

Career
Maury was a member of the Tennessee House of Representatives in 1831, 1832, 1843, and 1844. He was admitted to the bar in 1839 and practiced in Williamson County, Tennessee.

Elected as a White supporter to the Twenty-fourth Congress by Tennessee's eighth district and re-elected as a Whig to the Twenty-fifth Congress, Maury served from March 4, 1835, to March 3, 1839.  He was not a candidate for renomination in 1838.

Maury resumed the practice of law in Williamson County, Tennessee and also engaged in literary pursuits and lecturing. He served in the Tennessee Senate in 1845 and 1846.

Death
Maury died near Franklin, Tennessee July 22, 1848 (age 46 years, 209 days) and was interred in the family cemetery at Founders Pointe near Franklin, Tennessee.

References

External links

Abram Poindexter Maury, Jr.'s entry at the Biographical Directory of the United States Congress.
A letter from Abram Poindexter Maury, Sr. to Abram Poindexter Maury, Jr., hosted by United States Genealogy Network, Inc.

1801 births
1848 deaths
People from Williamson County, Tennessee
Maury family of Virginia
National Republican Party members of the United States House of Representatives from Tennessee
Whig Party members of the United States House of Representatives from Tennessee
Members of the Tennessee House of Representatives
Tennessee state senators